Karmah may refer to:

Karmah, Iraq, a city in Iraq near Fallujah
Kerma, an archaeological site in Sudan
Karmah (band), an Italian duo

See also
Karma (disambiguation)